A buckling spring is a type of keyswitch mechanism, popularized by IBM's keyboards for the PC, PC/AT, 5250/3270 terminals, PS/2, and other systems. According to the original patent: "A non-teasible, snap action, tactile feedback, key mechanism of extreme mechanical simplicity and high reliability is achieved."

Operation

The coil spring tensed between the keycap and a pivoting hammer buckles (i.e. kinks or collapses) at a certain point in its downward traverse, providing auditory and tactile feedback to the keyboard operator. Upon buckling, the hammer is pivoted forward by the spring and strikes an electrical contact which registers the key press. In a Model M, the electrical contact is a membrane sheet similar to that of a modern dome switch keyboard.

Image gallery

See also 
 Euler's critical load
 List of mechanical keyboards

References

External links 
 Wiki article on the various buckling spring mechanisms – From deskthority.net

Computer keyboards